Black Hunters is a 2008 Russian language action drama film directed by  Andrey Malyukov. The film features Danila Kozlovsky, Andrey Terentev, Vladimir Yaglych, Dmitriy Volkostrelov and Ekaterina Klimova in the lead roles. The movie is about time travel.

Plot
It shows four 21st century treasure seekers who travel in time to the Second World War in Russia. (the former Soviet Union in 1942.) They dig near St. Petersburg in search of hidden medals and artifacts of soldiers who fought during the war. The chief of the group is Borman (Danila Kozlovsky), who is a former student of the Faculty of History Sergei Filatov. His assistant is a Rastafarian nicknamed Spirit (Andrei Terentyev). Two other members are Chuhat (Dmitry Volkostrelov) and Skull (Vladimir Yaglych). Skull is a neo-Nazi and has a stylized tattoo of the swastika on his shoulder.

Cast 
Danila Kozlovsky as Borman
Andrey Terentev as Spirt
Vladimir Yaglych as Cherep
Dmitriy Volkostrelov as Chukha
Ekaterina Klimova as Nina
Boris Galkin as Emelyanov
Daniil Strakhov as Demin
Sergey Makhovikov as Karpenko

Awards

References

External links 

2008 films
2000s action war films
2008 science fiction action films
Russian action war films
Russian science fiction action films
Russian science fiction war films
Russian World War II films
Films directed by Andrei Malyukov
Films about time travel